"The Last Worthless Evening" is a song written  by John Corey, Don Henley, and Stan Lynch. It was a single recorded by Henley in 1989 that reached number 21 on the US Billboard Hot 100 chart. The song was included on Henley's third album The End of the Innocence that same year.

The song was inspired by Henley's interaction with actress Michelle Pfeiffer at a party they both attended. Pfeiffer, who was in a bad mood due to a recent breakup, was outside smoking a cigarette, when Henley joined her and tried to comfort her. She rejected his advances, which led to Henley's friend and actor Jack Nicholson sarcastically remarking, "nice going, Henley!"

Personnel 
 Don Henley – vocals, drums 
 John Corey – keyboards, guitars 
 Mike Campbell – additional guitars
 Bob Glaub – bass
 Stan Lynch – percussion

Chart performance

See also
The End of the Innocence (album)

References

External links
 Experts About

1989 singles
Don Henley songs
Songs written by Don Henley
1989 songs
Geffen Records singles
Songs written by Stan Lynch